The 2022 Spain Tri-Nation Series was a Twenty20 International (T20I) cricket tournament that was held in Spain from 29 April to 1 May 2022. The event was the first international series of the 2022 European summer season. The participating teams were the hosts Spain, along with Guernsey and Norway. The series was played at the Desert Springs Cricket Ground in Almería. All competing nations used the event as preparation for the 2022–23 ICC Men's T20 World Cup Europe Qualifier subregional tournaments.

Norway recovered from a slow start to beat Guernsey by 37 runs in the opening game. Day two saw both Spain and Guernsey defeat Norway, before the hosts beat Guernsey to end the day on top of the table. Spain were well beaten by Guernsey on the final morning, but followed this with a comfortable victory over Norway to claim the series.

Squads

Points Table

Fixtures

Notes

References

External links
 Series home at ESPNCricinfo

Associate international cricket competitions in 2022
Spain Tri-Nation Series
Spain Tri-Nation Series
2020s in Andalusia